Insu, the Queen Mother is a 2011 South Korean historical television series, starring Chae Shi-ra, Hahm Eun-jung, Kim Young-ho, Kim Mi-sook, Baek Sung-hyun and Jeon Hye-bin. Focusing on the fierce power struggle among three women in the royal court of the Joseon Dynasty, it aired from December 3, 2011 to June 24, 2012 on Saturdays and Sundays at 20:55 (KST) time slot for 60 episodes. It was one of the inaugural dramas on newly launched cable channel jTBC.

Chae Shi-ra reprised the role of Queen Insu; she previously played the same character in the 1998–2000 period drama The King and the Queen, also written by Jung Ha-yeon. She said she joined the series because she wanted to explore the character further, "This drama series focuses more on the ambitious side of Queen Insu, who dreams of becoming the absolute ruler of the Joseon Dynasty, and I liked the part."

Cast
 Chae Shi-ra as Queen Insu (23–60)
 Hahm Eun-jung as Han Jung (the future Queen Insu) (1–23) 
 Kim Mi-sook as Lady Yun, later Queen Jeonghui
 Kim Young-ho as Grand Prince Suyang, later King Sejo
 Baek Sung-hyun as Crown Prince Uigyeong (1–23) & Seongjong of Joseon (40–54) (dual role) 
 Jeon Hye-bin as Deposed Queen Yoon (23–54)
 Jin Ji-hee as Yoon Song-yi (the future Queen Yoon) (1–23)
 Kim Ga-yeon as Lady Han, Prince Gyeyang's wife and Jung's older sister
 Han In-soo as Kim Jongseo
 Lee Kwang-ki as Grand Prince Anpyeong
 Shim Yang-hong as Hwangbo In
 Choi Ji-na as Lady Yang Hye-bin, Sejong's concubine
 Jang Yong as Han Hwak
 Kim Yong-hee as Gwon Ram
 Kwon Ki-seon as Lady Shin, Song-yi's mother
 Lee Deok-hee as Court lady Kim
 Seo Yi-sook as Court lady Park
 Baek Su-ho as Yoon-goo
 Joo Min-soo as Yoon-woo
 Chae Sang-woo as King Danjong
 Son Byong-ho as Han Myung-hoe
 Yoo Ho-rin as Cho-sun
 Jo Jung-eun as Queen Jeongsun, Danjong's wife
 Choi Won-hong as Prince Jasan, later young King Seongjong (23–40)
 Jin Tae-hyun as King Yeonsan
 Jeon So-min as Jang Nok-su, Yeonsan's concubine
 Hong So-hee as Queen Shin, Yeonsan's wife
 Kwon Min as Heo Chim
 Kang Cho-hee as Lady Gwon Suk-ui
 Yoo Gyeom as Prince Hannam
 Sunwoo Jae-duk as King Munjong
 Jeon Moo-song as King Sejong
 Noh Young-hak as Grand Prince Haeyang, later King Yejong
 Lee Yeon-doo as Queen Ansun, Yejong's second wife
 Yoon Joo as Se-seon

Ratings 

 In this table,  represent the lowest ratings and  represent the highest ratings.

 Cable/Pay TV usually have a relatively smaller audience compared to free-to-air TV/public broadcasters (KBS, SBS, MBC and EBS).

Awards and nominations

International broadcast

Media release 
The series was released as a 3-DVD box set in Japan on March 22, April 26 and May 24, 2013 under NHK Enterprises.

.References

External links
  
 
 

Korean-language television shows
2011 South Korean television series debuts
2012 South Korean television series endings
JTBC television dramas
Television series set in the Joseon dynasty
South Korean historical television series
Television series by Drama House